Paradise Peak may refer to:

 Paradise Peak (Alaska), a summit of the Juneau Icefield
 Paradise Peak (Idaho), a mountain peak
 Paradise Peak (Nye County, Nevada), a town near Gabbs, Nevada
 Santa Rosa–Paradise Peak Wilderness,  a protected wilderness area in Humboldt County, Nevada
 Pic Paradis, the highest point on the Franco-Dutch island of Saint Martin